, English title: Asatarō, is a 1956 Japanese black-and-white film directed by Kenji Misumi.

Cast 
 Raizo Ichikawa
 Yataro Kurokawa
 Masamiku Sugiyama
 and others

References

External links 
 

1956 films
Japanese black-and-white films
Films directed by Kenji Misumi
Daiei Film films
1950s Japanese films